Revenge of the Stolen Stars is a 1985 American comedy fantasy film directed by Ulli Lommel and starring Klaus Kinski, Suzanna Love, Barry Hickey and Ulli Lommel.

Plot
A young man named Gene McBride inherits a large plantation and a mine of rubies on an island south of the China Sea. Gene moves there with his  beloved Kelly to search the Six Stars, a famous collection of rubies. However, soon enough the couple find out that they will have to live with the ghost of  Donald McBride, the original plantation owner and Gene's uncle, as well as confronting a curse.

Cast
 Barry Hickey as Gene McBride
 Suzanna Love as Kelly
 Klaus Kinski as Donald McBride
 Ulli Lommel as Max Stern
 Kitty O'Shea as Lupe
 Amable Aguiluz (as Tikoy Aguiluz)
 Tania Aija as Shace Maron
 Eugene Choy as Malu
 James Chung
 Sarah Golden
 Master Ho Sik Pak as Prince Kali (as Ho Sik Pak)
 Norman Ino
 Thom Jones
 Vincent Kramer
 Tuny Lee
 Joycelyne Lew as Maid (as Joyce Lew)
 Andy Lyon as Alex
 Joyce Macías Figueroa
 James Marshall as Consul
 Craig Minomiya
 Eric Wong

Production 
Director Ulli Lommel was unsure about casting Klaus Kinski, but he met him and Kinski was very nice, according to Lommel. But when the filming started, Kinski was very hard to work with. He complained about the lights and microphones, so eventually they had only few soft lights and very small microphones in the Kinski scenes, which is the reason why the sound quality changes much in different shots.

Kinski also didn't want to sit on a chair when camera crew was about to shoot from different angle, so continuity wasn't possible. Because of that Lommel decided to change Kinski's character to a ghost, which was a brilliant idea in Kinski's opinion.

Kinski drank heavily and at one point practically forced the entire crew to shoot almost thirty consecutive hours, so they could finally wrap Kinski's scenes and be done with his involvement. Kinski was so happy with the director that two days later he approached Lommel to show his appreciation, telling him that he had a great time while they worked together, and praising his directing style, to which Lommel politely thanked. Kinski also said that he wouldn't work in the future with anyone else than Lommel, but Lommel's half-soothing and half-ironical answer was "thank you Klaus, that's kind of you".

References

External links 
 

1985 films
1980s English-language films
1980s fantasy comedy films
Films directed by Ulli Lommel
American fantasy comedy films
1985 comedy films
1980s American films